Albertino Etchechury (born 16 July 1936) is a Uruguayan middle-distance runner. He competed in the men's 3000 metres steeplechase at the 1968 Summer Olympics.

References

External links
 

1936 births
Living people
Athletes (track and field) at the 1968 Summer Olympics
Uruguayan male middle-distance runners
Uruguayan male steeplechase runners
Olympic athletes of Uruguay
Pan American Games medalists in athletics (track and field)
Pan American Games bronze medalists for Uruguay
Athletes (track and field) at the 1963 Pan American Games
Athletes (track and field) at the 1967 Pan American Games
Medalists at the 1963 Pan American Games
20th-century Uruguayan people
21st-century Uruguayan people